Todor Yonov (born 11 May 1976 in Plovdiv) is a Bulgarian footballer who plays for and captains 1.SC Znojmo in the Czech Gambrinus Liga.

Career

In Bulgaria
Born in Plovdiv, Yonov is a product of the Lokomotiv Plovdiv youth teams, but failed to establish himself within the first team. Then he spent six years in the lower divisions with Maritsa-Iztok Radnevo, Dimitrovgrad, Botev Galabovo and Beroe 2000 Kazanlak, before returned to Lokomotiv in 2000.

Yonov made his debut for Lokomotiv Plovdiv on 5 August 2000 in a 3–1 loss against Marek Dupnitsa. He made 26 appearances in the Bulgarian B Group during the 2000–01 season, scoring one goal.

In June 2001, Yonov joined Beroe Stara Zagora on a season-long loan deal. After a loan spell at Beroe he moved on to play for Rodopa Smolyan, with whom he won promotion to the A PFG in May 2003.

On 28 July 2004, Yonov signed for newly promoted A PFG side Nesebar. He made his debut on 14 August in a 2–0 home win over Rodopa Smolyan.

Znojmo
In January 2005, Yonov signed for Czech club 1. SC Znojmo. In December 2009, Yonov was named Znojmo Sports Person of the Year. He became an integral part of the Znojmo side, captaining the team in their promotions to the Czech 2. Liga in 2010 and to the Gambrinus Liga in 2013. 

Yonov made his Gambrinus Liga debut against Dukla Prague on 19 July 2013, at age of 37, playing the full 90 minutes.

References

External links

Guardian Football

1976 births
Living people
Bulgarian footballers
Bulgarian expatriate footballers
First Professional Football League (Bulgaria) players
Czech First League players
PFC Lokomotiv Plovdiv players
PFC Beroe Stara Zagora players
PFC Rodopa Smolyan players
PFC Pirin Blagoevgrad players
PFC Nesebar players
1. SC Znojmo players
Expatriate footballers in the Czech Republic
Association football defenders